Richard Francis Cottingham (born November 25, 1946) is an American serial killer and rapist who murdered at least eighteen young women and girls in New York and New Jersey between 1967 and 1980. He was nicknamed the New York Ripper, the Torso Killer and the Times Square Killer, since his crimes often targeted prostitutes and included mutilation.

Cottingham's confirmed killings resulted in nine convictions and a further eight confessions under non-prosecution agreements, leading to him serving multiple life sentences in New Jersey prisons. In 2009, decades after his first five murder convictions, Cottingham told a journalist that he had committed at least 80 to 100 "perfect murders" of women in various regions of the United States. Four surviving abduction-rape victims testified against Cottingham; he was convicted in three of the cases and acquitted in one.

Early life and career
Richard Francis Cottingham was born on November 25, 1946, in the Mott Haven neighborhood of the Bronx in New York City, the first of four children. In 1948, Cottingham's family moved to Dumont, New Jersey, and in 1956 to River Vale, New Jersey, where he began his fascination with bondage pornography. In 1964, Cottingham graduated from Pascack Valley High School in Hillsdale, New Jersey.

After his graduation, Cottingham worked for Metropolitan Life, where his father was a vice-president, starting in the mail room at the firm's Manhattan headquarters and eventually became a mainframe computer operator upon taking computer courses. In October 1966, he became a computer operator for Blue Cross Blue Shield Association, where he worked until his 1980 arrest. At Blue Cross, Cottingham worked in an office with Rodney Alcala, the fugitive child molester and future serial killer who lived in New York under the alias "John Berger". Neither man has claimed to have been aware of the other, nor is there any evidence they were familiar with each other prior to their respective arrests.

On May 3, 1970, Cottingham was married at Our Lady of Lourdes Church in Queens Village, Queens. He had three children, two boys and a girl, with his wife. In April 1978, Cottingham's wife filed for divorce on the grounds of "abandonment" and "mental cruelty" (refusing to have sex with her after the birth of their third child, staying out until early morning, and leaving her with insufficient household funds). His wife withdrew the petition upon his arrest in May 1980, then completed the divorce after his 1981 conviction.

Criminal history

Early arrests for lesser crimes
Cottingham was arrested on several lesser charges throughout his killing spree. Police were not aware of his murders at the time, nor were they aware that an active serial killer was at large in the New York-New Jersey area.

On October 3, 1969, Cottingham was charged and convicted of drunk driving in New York City and was fined $50. On August 21, 1972, he is charged and convicted of shoplifting at a Stern's department store in Paramus, New Jersey, and was sentenced to pay a $50 fine or ten days in jail. On September 4, 1973, Cottingham was arrested in New York City for robbery, oral sodomy and sexual abuse on the complaint of a prostitute and her pimp. Neither complainant appeared in further proceedings, however, and the case was dismissed. On March 12, 1974, Cottingham was arrested in New York City for robbery and unlawful imprisonment on the complaint of another prostitute. Once again, the victim did not appear in further proceedings and the case was dismissed.

Murders
Cottingham committed his first known murder when he was 20 years old, although he claims to have started as an adolescent. On October 28, 1967, he strangled Nancy Schiava Vogel, a 29-year-old married mother of two, in Little Ferry, New Jersey. Vogel's nude and bound body was found on October 31, under a blanket behind the passenger seat of her car parked in nearby Ridgefield Park. The murder remained unsolved until Cottingham confessed and entered a guilty plea in August 2010.

On February 15, 1968, Cottingham killed his second known victim. After failing to return home from a trip to buy shoes at the Green Acres Mall in Valley Stream, New York, 23-year-old Diane Cusick was found raped, beaten, and strangled to death in the back seat of her car, parked near the mall. Cottingham was not charged with this murder until June 2022, when he was implicated by DNA.

Cottingham was convicted of five murders in a series of three trials between 1981 and 1984 (two in New Jersey and one in New York). On December 15, 1977, the body of X-ray technician Maryann Carr, 26, was found brutally beaten and strangled in the parking lot of the Quality Inn motel in Hasbrouck Heights, New Jersey, but police did not link the murder to Cottingham until his 1980 arrest at the same motel.

On December 2, 1979, firemen in New York responded to an alarm at the Travel Inn motel near Times Square. Inside they found the bodies of 22-year-old sex worker Deedeh Goodarzi and an unidentified woman estimated to be aged between 16 and 22.  Both bodies had their hands and heads removed, and had been doused with lighter fluid and set on fire. As Cottingham was fleeing the scene of the torso murders, he briefly encountered the 23-year-old Peter Vronsky, who was attempting to check into the Travel Inn while in New York on a film production assignment. The brief encounter later inspired Vronsky to write his serial killer histories and paved the way for his prison meetings with Cottingham four decades later. In a 2009 interview, Cottingham admitted to the murders and claimed that he severed the heads and hands of the victims to prevent their identification, as he was acquainted with Goodarzi and had been seen with her in a bar the night before.

On May 5, 1980, a motel housekeeper found the body of 19-year-old Valerie Ann Street in the Hasbrouck Heights Quality Inn. The victim's hands were tightly handcuffed behind her back and police would later lift a fingerprint matching Cottingham, the only fingerprint successfully found from any of his known murders. This murder was later linked to the 1977 murder of Maryann Carr, who was left in the same motel's parking lot. On May 15, 1980, Jean Reyner was strangled and her throat cut in New York's historic Seville Hotel. Cottingham severed the victim's breasts and posed them on the headboard of the bed, and set fire to the mattress under her body before fleeing, similar to the Travel Inn torso killings.

Starting in 2014, Cottingham confidentially admitted to Detective Robert Anzilotti of the Bergen County Prosecutor's Office (BCPO) to being the perpetrator of the murders of three teenage females between 1968 and 1969. Jacalyn "Jackie" Harp, aged 13, was randomly ambushed as she walked home in the evening of July 17, 1968, from school band practice in Midland Park and strangled with the leather strap of her bag. Irene Blase, aged 18, vanished on April 7, 1969, in Hackensack and was found face down in four feet of water in the Saddle River, strangled with a wire, a cord, or perhaps the chain of a crucifix she was wearing. Denise Falasca, aged 15, was abducted on July 14, 1969, in Emerson, while walking to a friend's home and found the next morning in Saddle Brook, by the side of a road next to a cemetery, strangled with the cord or the chain of her crucifix.

The BCPO "exceptionally closed" the three cold case murders with agreement from the victims' families and evidence corroborating the confessions, but for several years kept this secret from the public to keep Cottingham talking about other cases. In December 2019, forensic historian and author Peter Vronsky, on the eve of publishing the revelation in his second edition of Serial Killers: The Method and Madness of Monsters, publicized the confessions with the BCPO's cooperation, in a community meeting in Midland Park. Anzilotti and BCPO subsequently confirmed the "exceptional closures" of these three murders.

In April 2021, Cottingham confessed to the unsolved 1974 double-abduction, rape, and forcible drowning murders of Lorraine Marie Kelly, 16, and Mary Ann Pryor, 17, in Montvale, one of New Jersey's most notorious cold cases. The confession was extracted by Detective Anzilotti weeks before his retirement and was facilitated by historian Vronsky and by Jennifer Weiss, the daughter of Deedeh Goodarzi, one of Cottingham's later victims. Vronsky and Weiss had been meeting with Cottingham in prison since the spring of 2017, counseling him to make the confession.  Anzilotti had spent 15 years interviewing Cottingham, working toward the confession.

In August 2022, with a non-prosecution agreement, officials in Rockland County, New York, corroborated and accepted Cottingham's confession to the murder of 26-year-old Lorraine McGraw, who was beaten and killed March 1, 1970. In December 2022, Cottingham was convicted of Diane Cusick's 1968 murder and, under a non-prosecution agreement, officially admitted to killing another four women during 1972–1973 in Long Island, New York: Mary Beth Heinz, Laverne Moye, Sheila Heiman, and Maria Emerita Rosado Nieves.

Arrest and charges
In the early hours of May 22, 1980, Cottingham picked up 18-year-old Leslie Ann O'Dell, who was soliciting on the corner of Manhattan's Lexington Avenue and 25th Street. She agreed to have sex with him for money. Around dawn, they checked into the same Hasbrouck Heights Quality Inn where he had left Valerie Street's handcuffed body under a bed to be discovered by a housekeeper. Cottingham offered to give O'Dell a massage and she rolled onto her stomach. Straddling her back, he drew a knife and put it to her throat as he snapped a pair of handcuffs on her wrists. He began torturing her, nearly biting off one of her nipples. She later testified that he said, "You have to take it. The other girls did, you have to take it, too. You're a whore and you have to be punished." O'Dell's muffled cries of pain became so loud that the motel staff, already uneased by the previous two murders of Carr and Street, called police and then rushed to the room demanding that Cottingham open the door. Cottingham was apprehended in the hallway by arriving police officers. When arrested, he had handcuffs, a leather gag, two slave collars, a switchblade knife, replica pistols, and a stockpile of prescription pills.

The charges listed in Cottingham's New Jersey indictment included kidnapping, attempted murder, aggravated assault, aggravated assault with deadly weapon, aggravated sexual assault while armed (rape), aggravated sexual assault while armed (sodomy), aggravated sexual assault while armed (fellatio), possession of a weapon (switchblade knife), and possession of controlled substances (secobarbital, amobarbital and diazepam). In April 1978, after his wife had initiated divorce proceedings, he kept a locked room in a basement apartment of the house in which they lived in Lodi, New Jersey.  Following his 1980 arrest, police found, in the locked room and in the trunk of his car, personal effects which they traced to several of his victims.

Convictions and confessions
During the early 1980s, Cottingham was convicted of five murders – in two separate New Jersey trials in 1981 and 1982, and in a single New York trial in 1984 for three murders. Cottingham was apparently "forensically aware" in the era before DNA analysis. In the thirteen-year period during which he is known to have committed at least seventeen murders, only one fingerprint belonging to him was ever recovered, from the ratchet mechanism of handcuffs left behind on Valerie Street. A case based on his "signature pattern" was built against him, combined with the testimony of four surviving victims, as well as pieces of his victims' jewellery and other items found in his possession after his arrest. He pleaded innocent and for decades insisted he was being "framed", until admitting in 2009 that he had actually perpetrated those five murders.

In 2010, he pleaded guilty to the 1967 murder of Nancy Vogel. Then in exchange for immunity from prosecution, he confessed to murdering three New Jersey schoolgirls. In 2021, he pleaded guilty to the 1974 kidnapping, raping and drowning of Lorraine Marie Kelly and Mary Ann Pryor. In 2022, Cottingham officially confessed to the 1970 murder of Lorraine McGraw, under a non-prosecution agreement. His additional confession to a 1974 murder was discounted by Rockland County police.

In 2022, Cottingham was arraigned from his prison hospital bed for the 1968 murder of Diane Cusick in Long Island, New York. Authorities believed it to be, thus far, the oldest criminal case to be solved and prosecuted by direct DNA evidence. He pleaded guilty in a December court appearance, and also officially admitted killing four other women in Long Island: Mary Beth Heinz, Laverne Moye, Sheila Heiman, and Maria Emerita Rosado Nieves.

Victims
Although Cottingham has formally admitted to eighteen killings and has claimed to have killed as many as 100, he is known to have only murdered seventeen girls between 1967 and 1980 and attempted to kill a further four. Cottingham primarily sought prostitutes who were petite blondes in their late teens to mid-twenties. He would approach them in bars, drug them with the date rape drug Tuinal, take them to a remote location—typically a motel—where he would bind, gag, torture, and stab them before killing them by strangling them with a ligature. 

He would occasionally remove and dispose of his victims heads and hands, presumably to make identification more difficult. He was also known to threaten them with a plastic gun and leave it within their reach so they could try to grab it only to find out it was false, severely bite and scrape their nipples, cut around the breasts, and use other forms of torture. He forced his victims to address him as "master". Trophies like jewellery and other personal items belonging to his victims were taken by him. The following is a chronological summary of Cottingham's seventeen identified murder victims and four identified survivors:

Mary Ann Della Sala, 17
 Nancy "Bubby" Schiava Vogel, 29, a married mother of two, was found dead in her automobile, bound and naked, in Ridgefield Park, New Jersey, on October 30, 1967. She had been last seen three days earlier in Little Ferry, when she left home to play bingo with friends at a local church. Instead, Vogel chose to do her shopping in a mall in Bergen County. Cottingham met Vogel at the shopping centre and kidnapped her. He took her to a field in Montvale and strangled her there. Vogel and Cottingham were acquaintances. Cottingham admitted to killing Vogel in March 2010 and was found convicted of her murder on August 25, 2010.
 Diane Martin Cusick, 23, a Long Island dance teacher and mother was found dead on February 16, 1968 in the back seat of her car, a 1961 Plymouth Valiant, outside the Green Acres Mall in Valley Stream, New York with adhesive tape around her mouth and neck. She had been beaten, raped, and strangled. Her hands had defence wounds. DNA from semen discovered at the crime scene was extracted, and it matched a sample retrieved from Cottingham. Near the Green Acres Mall, there was a drive-in theatre that Cottingham frequently visited. Authorities believe Cottingham approached Cusick while pretending to be a mall security guard or police officer. Cottingham was convicted of her murder on December 5, 2022.
 Jacalyn Leah “Jackie” Harp, 13, vanished on July 17, 1968, in Midland Park, New Jersey, after she failed to come home from band rehearsal on the field at Midland School. She performed as a flag twirler for the "All-Girls Drum and Bugle Corps" band at her school. The next morning, on July 18, her body was discovered at Goffle Creek on Morrow Road; she had been beaten about the face and had been strangled with the leather strap from her flag sling. Police believed the attack was sexually motivated despite the fact that she had not been raped and her clothes were described as being in "disarray." Cottingham admitted to killing Harp in 2017. Cottingham claimed that he attempted to persuade her to get into his car, but she resisted. He then drove his car in front of Harp, stopped, and walked over to her. Cottingham caught up to Harp despite her attempts to flee, dragged her into a cluster of bushes, and killed her there.
 Irene Blase, 18, was reported missing on April 7, 1969. On April 8, she was discovered face-down in four feet of water in Saddle River, strangled with a wire, cable, or possibly the chain from a crucifix she was wearing. Cottingham admitted to strangling Blase in 2014. Cottingham confessed that he saw Blase shopping in Hackensack, New Jersey and convinced her to join him for a drink. Taking a bus to another location, Cottingham and Blase spent some time together after which Cottingham offered to bring Blase back to the bus station. Shortly after, he killed her.
 On Monday, July 13, 1969, at approximately 8:00 p.m., Denise Falasca, 15, left her residence on Bergenline Avenue in Closter, New Jersey. On her way to meet friends in Westwood, New Jersey, Denise was last observed by family members. At 11:00 p.m. Denise was scheduled to be back home, but she never arrived. At around 9:00 p.m. that night, witnesses claimed to have seen Denise heading along Old Hook Road in Emerson in the direction of Westwood. Falasca's body was found on the side of Westminster Place in Saddle Brook, New Jersey, the next day, on July 14. In 2014, Cottingham admitted to the murder. Falasca, according to him, was walking down the side of the road in Emerson when he pulled up next to her and offered her a ride. 
 On March 1, 1970, a group of hikers came across a young woman's naked body in the woods to the west of Tweed Boulevard in South Nyack, New York. The victim had marks around her neck indicating that she had been strangled. She had been deceased for nearly 48 hours, authorities eventually discovered. The FBI identified the decedent as Lorraine Montalvo McGraw, 26, who lived in Long Island and had been missing since February 27, 1970. McGraw had a lengthy history of drug and prostitution offences; many of them were listed under false names. McGraw "worked" in a number of clubs, bars, and adult establishments, according to the police. On August 26, 2022, Cottingham admitted to killing McGraw.
 The body of Mary Beth Heinz, 21, was discovered on May 10, 1972, near a creek in Rockville Centre, New York. She had cuts on her face and neck from being strangled. Heinz, who experienced grand mal seizures and had been diagnosed with epilepsy, vanished on May 5 as she boarded a bus to travel to a nearby epilepsy dance. The murder was confessed to by Cottingham on December 5, 2022. He claimed to have thrown her body from Rockville Center's Peninsula Boulevard bridge.
 The body of mother of two, Laverne Moye, 23, of St. Albans, Queens, was discovered in a Rockville Centre creek on July 20, 1972. She had been killed by being strangled. The murder was admitted to by Cottingham on December 5, 2022. In addition, he asserted that he had thrown her body off the same Peninsula Boulevard bridge where he had previously dumped Heinz's body.
 Sheila Heiman, 33, was found bludgeoned and stabbed to death in her home in North Woodmere, New York on July 20, 1973. When her husband returned after a trip to a department store that morning, he discovered her dead in the master bathroom. None of the rooms outside of the bathroom showed evidence of a struggle. None of Heiman's neighbours reported anything strange around the time of her death, and the autopsy had ruled out rape. Cottingham confessed to her murder on December 5, 2022.
 Marita Emerita Rosado Nieves, 18, was a Puerto Rican national who was found dead in Wantagh, New York on December 27, 1973. She was found strangled to death in a weeded area close to the East Bathhouse bus stop on Ocean Parkway at Jones Beach. She was discovered by park maintenance personnel wrapped in a grey blanket and covered in plastic bags. Cottingham confessed to her murder on December 5, 2022.
 On Friday, August 9, 1974, Lorraine Marie Kelly, 16, and Mary Ann Pryor, 17, left North Bergen, New Jersey with plans to go shopping at the Garden State Plaza in Paramus, New Jersey. Ricky Molinari, Kelly's boyfriend, left the two off at a bus stop on Broad Street in Ridgefield, New Jersey. They intended to hitchhike from there. In a wooded location close to the Ridgemont Gardens complex in Montvale, New Jersey, on August 14, both of their bodies were found. Both were naked and bound to one another at the wrists and ankles while lying facedown next to each other. About 36 to 40 hours had passed since their deaths when they were discovered. Both were beaten and raped; the ligature marks on their necks suggested that they had likely been strangled as well. Both also had cigarette burns on the flesh. Cottingham was convicted of both of their murders on April 27, 2021. In court, Cottingham admitted to kidnapping the girls, then tying them up and raping them both in a motel room. He killed them by drowning them in the bathtub.
 At approximately 7:00 a.m. on the morning of December 16, 1977, the body of X-ray technician Maryann “Marzi” Cangemi Carr, 26, was found between a parked van and a chain-link fence in Little Ferry, New Jersey. Carr was found wearing a white nurse’s uniform. The victim's left leg was visible since the uniform's pants had been slashed. On her right leg, she was discovered to have a clump of her own hair. Carr's shoes were missing from the crime scene. Carr was last seen on December 15, the day before, conversing with a man described as white, around 32-years-old, and brown-haired in the parking lot of the Ledgewood Terrance Apartments, which Cottingham and his wife had previously resided in. Cottingham kidnapped her from the apartment complex and took her to a Quality Inn in Hasbrouck Heights, New Jersey. Once she was inside, Cottingham beat, bit, slashed, and raped her. She had been choked and then restrained. Afterward, Cottingham dumped her in the parking lot of the Quality Inn, not far from the Ledgewood Terrace apartments. The ligature that had been used to kill her was still around her neck when she was found. Carr exhibited handcuff-related bruises on her wrists, ankles, as well as remnants of adhesive tape on her mouth. Her body also had numerous bite marks and cuts on it. Cottingham was convicted of her murder on October 12, 1982.
 Pregnant waitress Karen Schilt, 22, met Cottingham who referred to himself as 'Joseph Schaefer' at 9 p.m. on March 22, 1978, in a Manhattan bar. Schilt exited the Third Avenue Tavern and made her way back to her 94 Third Avenue apartment. She was nonetheless picked up by Cottingham and driven down Route 80 in New Jersey after feeling nauseous. Karen took the pills Cottingham gave her and lost consciousness. When she awoke, she was a patient at the Hackensack Hospital. Patrolman Raymond Auger of the Little Ferry Police Department had driven her there. Near the Ledgewood Terrace Apartments, in a parking lot, Auger had discovered Karen motionless. She had been sexually assaulted by Cottingham, who then abandoned her in a sewer, with her breasts and genitalia exposed.
 Prostitute Susan Geiger, 19, was approached by Cottingham on the night of October 10 , 1978. The incident happened in Manhattan between Broadway and Seventh Avenue on West 47th Street. Although Susan informed Cottingham that she had reservations for the remainder of the evening, she left him her contact information at the Alpine Hotel. The following evening, Cottingham called Susan and asked her out on a date at midnight. He picked Susan up in his maroon Thunderbird after she gave her consent. Susan would later describe Cottingham, who called himself 'Jim', as friendly. Cottingham plied Susan with a number of drugged drinks when they headed to Flanagan's Tavern on First Avenue. Susan would subsequently awaken covered in her own blood in Room 28 of the Airport Motel in South Hackensack, New Jersey. Susan had been tortured by Cottingham, who injured her face, breasts, vagina, and rectum. In addition, he had beaten Susan multiple times with a garden hose and torn Susan's gold earrings out of her ears. The prostitute was taken to the hospital by Captain John Agar of the South Hackensack Police Department. Additionally, Captain Agar looked into Room 28 and gave the New Jersey State Police Laboratory a number of pieces of evidence. Here, investigators found seminal fluid that a male with type O blood had left behind on a towel.
 Workers at the Travel Lodge Motor Inn in New York City, New York, made a call to the nearby fire department on December 2, 1979, at around 9 a.m. The call was made as a result of the personnel discovering significant smoke inside Room 417. A "Do Not Disturb" sign was hanging from the door latch of the room, which had been rented by "Carl Wilson" since November 29, 1979. Two naked female bodies were discovered by the firefighters on two different beds. Prior to their deaths, the women were brutalised, and their murderer burned their bodies. Both women's hands had been severed, and the killer had also beheaded them. The missing body parts were never found. A later autopsy revealed that both women had been tortured and sexually assaulted while still alive for several days. Deedeh Goodarzi, 22, a Kuwaiti immigrant who worked as a prostitute, was identified shortly afterward. The other victim remains unidentified and is referred to as Manhattan Jane Doe. Cottingham was convicted of their murders on July 9, 1984.
 On May 5, 1980, the body of Valerie Ann Street, 19, a sex worker, was found at the same Quality Inn where Cottingham had dumped Carr’s body in Hasbrouck Heights, New Jersey by motel worker Maryann Sancanelli. Using the alias “Shelly Dudley,” Street checked into Room 132 with Cottingham. He had stuffed Street’s body under the bed for housekeeping to find. Investigators discovered Street handcuffed and with two ligature marks on her throat. They also discovered that she had been gagged with white adhesive tape. Street had bite marks on her breasts in addition to being bitten all over her body and head. She also had numerous minor incisions on her breasts. Street had been suffocated to death. Cottingham was convicted of her murder on June 12, 1981.
 On May 12, 1980, prostitute Pamela Weisenfeld was found beaten up in a parking lot in Teaneck, New Jersey. According to police and medical reports, Weisenfeld's attacker bit her multiple times. After meeting Cottingham, Pamela had been drugged and brutally beaten, suffering several injuries all over her body. After being found, Teaneck police took her to a hospital.
 Jean Renyer, 25, was discovered on May 15, 1980, at the Seville Hotel on 22 E. 29th Street in New York City, New York. Investigators discovered that Reyner's attacker had cut her throat and removed both of her breasts. The murderer had left the breasts on the headboard of the bed. Reyner's body had been set on fire as part of the perpetrator's attempt to get rid of evidence. Cottingham was convicted of her murder on July 9, 1984.
 At 9:30 a.m. on May 22, 1980, police entered Room 117 at the same Quality Inn where Carr and Street were murdered and found 18-year-old Leslie Ann O’Dell, a known runaway and prostitute. O'Dell was picked up by Cottingham in Manhattan on May 21. The two had used a car to get to the Quality Inn from there. O'Dell claimed to have been tormented by Cottingham for hours before she was able to scream out for help. As Cottingham attempted to flee down the corridor of the motel, officers apprehended him.

Footnotes
 On October 7, 1974, 15-year-old Lisa Thomas left her home and walked to the Nanuet Mall at 3:30 p.m., intending to buy a blouse. About 700 feet from their Nanuet, New York home, Thomas' body was found by her father the following morning in the woods behind the mall. Thomas was blindfolded with a crimson rag that she had in her purse and her head had been bashed in. Thomas had not been sexually assaulted. On August 26, 2022, Cottingham admitted to killing both her and McGraw. Despite his admission, the investigation into her death is still ongoing, and he was not charged with the crime. This is because authorities did not agree with or take Cottingham's statements regarding Thomas seriously.

In media
Cottingham's case has been discussed in several books and documentaries on serial killers. Two focused entirely on him: Rod Leith's The Prostitute Murders: The People vs. Richard Cottingham (Lyle Stuart Inc., 1983) and Crime Scene: The Times Square Killer (Netflix, 2021).

See also
 List of serial killers in the United States
 List of serial killers by number of victims

References

External links
 New Jersey Girl Murders Project 

1946 births
1967 murders in the United States
20th-century American criminals
American male criminals
American murderers of children
American people convicted of murder
American people convicted of rape
American people convicted of sexual assault
American prisoners sentenced to life imprisonment
American rapists
American serial killers
Criminals from New Jersey
Criminals from New York City
Living people
Male serial killers
Pascack Valley High School alumni
People convicted of murder by New Jersey
People convicted of murder by New York (state)
People from Lodi, New Jersey
People from River Vale, New Jersey
People from the Bronx
Prisoners sentenced to life imprisonment by New Jersey
Prisoners sentenced to life imprisonment by New York (state)
Torture in the United States
Violence against women in the United States